The 1921 Maryland Aggies football team was an American football team that represented the University of Maryland in the South Atlantic Intercollegiate Athletic Association (SAIAA) during the 1921 college football season. In their 11th season under head coach Curley Byrd, the Aggies compiled a 3–5–1 record (2–2–1 against SAIAA opponents), finished eighth place in the conference, and were outscored by a total of 127 to 45.

Schedule

References

Maryland
Maryland Terrapins football seasons
Maryland Aggies football